Benjamin Louis Rosenbloom (June 3, 1880 – March 22, 1965) was a Jewish member of the United States House of Representatives from West Virginia.

Born in Braddock, Pennsylvania to Russian-Jewish immigrants, Rosenbloom attended the public schools and graduated from the North Braddock High School. He attended West Virginia University at Morgantown, studied law, was admitted to the bar in 1904 and commenced practice in Wheeling, Ohio County, West Virginia in 1905.

He was elected and served as a member of the West Virginia State Senate from 1914 to 1918.

Rosenbloom was elected from West Virginia's 1st District  as a Republican to the Sixty-seventh and Sixty-eighth Congresses (March 4, 1921 – March 3, 1925) as the first Jewish member of Congress from West Virginia. He was not a candidate for renomination in 1924, having become a candidate for the United States Senate.  He was an unsuccessful candidate for the Republican nomination for United States Senator in 1924.

He resumed the practice of his profession in Wheeling, published a weekly newspaper from 1933 to 1935, was a councilman and vice mayor of Wheeling, West Virginia from 1935 to 1939, and retired from law practice in 1951.  He died in Cleveland, Ohio on March 22, 1965.

See also
 List of Jewish members of the United States Congress
 List of United States representatives from West Virginia

References

1880 births
1965 deaths
People from Braddock, Pennsylvania
American people of Russian-Jewish descent
Jewish American state legislators in West Virginia
Jewish members of the United States House of Representatives
Republican Party members of the United States House of Representatives from West Virginia
Republican Party West Virginia state senators
West Virginia city council members
Politicians from Wheeling, West Virginia
20th-century American politicians
Lawyers from Wheeling, West Virginia
West Virginia University alumni
20th-century American lawyers